Ellen Lee Beaumont (born 14 July 1985) is an Australian association football player who played for Australian W-League team Brisbane Roar.

Honours
With Brisbane Roar:
 W-League Premiership: 2008–09
 W-League Championship: 2008–09

References 

1985 births
Living people
Brisbane Roar FC (A-League Women) players
A-League Women players
Australian women's soccer players
Women's association football midfielders